Law enforcement in Italy is centralized on a national level, carried out by multiple national forces, helped by few limited local agencies. The Italian law enforcement system is considered complex, with multiple police forces and other agencies taking part in different duties. Policing in the Italian system refers to the duties of "full-powered officers" coming from the three national main forces: Polizia di Stato (State Police), Carabinieri and Guardia di Finanza (Financial Guard). While the duties of these three corps' include investigating arresting, other local forces carry out limited duties.

The two main police forces in the country are the Carabinieri, the national gendarmerie, as well as the Polizia di Stato, the civil national police. The third one is the Guardia di Finanza, a militarized police force responsible for dealing with financial crime, smuggling, illegal drug trade, and others. The main forces are managed and organized on a provincial level under the authority of the Questore (the local head of police) in accordance with the Prefetto, the provincial representative of the Government. Border and Maritime patrolling are undertaken by the Guardia di Finanza and Guardia Costiera (coast guard). The Polizia Penitenziaria (Prison Police) is the national prison police agency, controlling penitentiaries and inmate transfers. The Corpo Forestale dello Stato (State Forestry Corps) formerly existed as a separate national park ranger agency, but was merged into the Carabinieri in 2016. Although policing in Italy is primarily provided on a national basis, there also exists Polizia Provinciale (provincial police) and Polizia Municipale (municipal police).

Law enforcement in Italy is an exclusive function of the State and is organized under the Ministry of the Interior, with provincial division and jurisdiction. The highest office in charge of law enforcement is the ministerial office of "Dipartimento della Pubblica Sicurezza". The Carabinieri, are also Military Police for the Italian Armed Forces, in charge of investigation or intervention inside Public Administrations and personal rights violations. There is also a section of the President of Republic safety corps called Corazzieri. Carabinieri stations are usually distributed all over the country, with a station approximately in every municipality (or at least every 5 km), with additional stations in strategical positions along the motorways.

In 2005, the total number of active police officers in all of the agencies was 324,339 in Italy, the highest number in the European Union both overall and per capita, twice the number of agents in the similarly sized United Kingdom.

Structure

National police forces

Polizia di Stato 

The Polizia di Stato (State Police) is the civil national police of Italy. Along with patrolling, investigative and law enforcement duties, it patrols the Autostrade (Italy's Express Highway network), and oversees the security of railways, bridges, and waterways.

It is a civilian police force, while the Carabinieri and the Guardia di Finanza are military. While its internal organization and mindset are somewhat military, its personnel is composed of civilians. Its headquarters are in Rome, and there are Regional and Provincial divisions throughout the Italian territory.

A program  Polizia di Quartiere ("Neighbourhood Police") has been implemented which increases police presence and deters crime. Pairs of poliziotti (policemen) or carabinieri patrol areas of major cities on foot or by bike.

Guardia di Finanza 

The Guardia di Finanza, (Financial Guard) is a military corps under the authority of the Ministry of Economy and Finance, with a role as a police force.

The Corps is in charge of financial, economic, judiciary and public safety such as tax evasion, financial crimes, smuggling, money laundering, international illegal drug trafficking, illegal immigration, customs and borders checks, copyright violations, anti-Mafia operations, credit card fraud, cybercrime, counterfeiting, terrorist financing, maintaining public order, and safety, political and military defense of the Italian borders.

The Guardia di Finanza has a strength of around 68,000 soldiers working as agents, non-commissioned officers and officers. Its militaries are in service in the Europol, Eurojust and the European Anti-Fraud Office. Its Latin motto since 1933 is Nec recisa recedit. The Guardia di Finanza also maintains boats, ships and aircraft to fulfill its mission of patrolling Italy's territorial waters.

During demonstrations and very big events, the Guardia di Finanza is often called on duty as riot police.

Arma dei Carabinieri 

The Carabinieri is the common name for the Arma dei Carabinieri, a gendarmerie-like military corps with police duties. They also serve as the military police for the Italian armed forces and can be called upon for national defence action."

The Carabinieri have become a separate armed force (alongside the Army, Navy and Air Force), thus ending their long-standing tradition as the First Corps (Arma) of the Italian Army (Esercito). They are referred to as the Arma or La Benemerita (The Meritorious Corps).

Carabinieri units have been dispatched all over the world in peacekeeping missions, including Bosnia, Kosovo, Afghanistan and Iraq. Until 2001, only men were allowed to become part of the Arma (or any military force, for that matter), but military reforms allowed women to serve in the Italian military, including Carabinieri.

Having both military police duties and civil police duties, the Arma is usually called on duty as riot police during big events and demonstrations. According to Europol, this force has "4,672 stations and lieutenancies".

Polizia Penitenziaria 

The Polizia Penitenziaria (Prison Guards, literally Penitentiary Police, also translated as Prison Police Corps) operates the Italian prison system and handles the transportation of inmates. The training academies for the Polizia Penitenziaria are located in Aversa, Monastir, Cairo Montenotte, Castiglione delle Stiviere, Parma, Portici, Rome, San Pietro Clarenza, Verbania and Sulmona.

Its agents are sometimes called to help the other police forces during major events. This force (part of the Ministry of Justice) has a "nationwide remit for prison security, inmate safety and transportation".

Corpo Forestale dello Stato (dissolved) 

The Corpo Forestale dello Stato (National Forestry Department, now dissolved) was responsible for law enforcement in Italian national parks and forests. Their duties included enforcing poaching laws, safeguarding protected animal species and preventing forest fires.

Founded in 1822, the Corpo Forestale dello Stato was a civilian police force specialized in environmental protection. A recent law reform expanded its duties to food controls.
In Italy, it had the responsibility to manage the activities related to the CITES (Convention on International Trade in Endangered Species).
The Autonomous Region of Sardinia has its own corp of forestry police.

Corpo Forestale dello Stato was dissolved on December 31, 2016, and all personnel become militarized and absorbed into the Carabinieri's Comando unità per la tutela forestale, ambientale e agroalimentare.

Interforces 
The Direzione Investigativa Antimafia (or DIA) (Anti-Mafia Investigation Directorate) is a joint organization of Polizia di Stato, Carabinieri, Polizia Penitenziaria and Guardia di Finanza against organized crime. 
Founded in 1991, under the authority of the Ministry of the Interior as the Direzione Nazionale Antimafia (National Anti-Mafia Directorate), its operations include preemptive investigations, judicial investigations, and international relations, and it investigates characteristics, objectives, and methods of the Mafia as well as their domestic and international contacts. The DIA was to prevent mafiosi from infiltrating the government.

Interpol's National Central Bureau for Italy is part of the International Police Cooperation Service (SCIP), a branch of the Public Security Department (PSD). "SCIP is a multi-agency DPS unit: the Polizia di Stato, Carabinieri and Guardia di Finanza head it, on a rotation basis. Officers representing all police forces staff it", the agency states.

The Direzione Centrale per i Servizi Antidroga (Central Directorate for Anti-Drug Services) is a joint organization of Polizia di Stato, Carabinieri and Guardia di Finanza against drug trafficking. Founded in 1976 as Direzione Anti Droga (Anti-Drug Directorate), it is under the authority of the Criminal police department of the Ministry of the Interior.

Local police forces
Local communities in Italy also have responsibility for local police issues.

They generally fall into either:

Provincial Police (Polizia Provinciale)
Local/Municipality Police (Polizia Locale).

Provincial Police

The Polizia Provinciale (Provincial Police) is local police only used in some of the 107 Provinces of Italy.

Their main tasks are to enforce regional and national hunting and fishing laws, but have also expanded in wildlife management and environmental protection. They also provide a traffic police service and participation in the security services arranged by the authorities.

Some municipal police forces in Italy trace historical origins to the vigili urbani and comes stabili of ancient Rome. Urban policing emerged in the 13th to 14th centuries in the Italian comunes (such as Bologna); although police forces have been assumed to be a modern innovation, these medieval forces had some similarities to modern police forces. Today, Italian municipal forces are referred to by various names, such as polizia comunale (comune police), polizia urbana (urban police), and polizia locale (local police).

Municipal and Local Police 

In addition, each comune has its own Polizia Municipale (Municipal Police) whose main duty is traffic control and responsibilities relating to licenses and urban regulations.

The municipal police also serve as auxiliaries to security police forces and have responsibilities for local crime prevention and community policing. The jurisdiction of municipal police are limited to their specific municipality.

Regional Forces in Sardinia and other Autonomous Regions 
Some Autonomous Regions have special forces of local police that answer to the Regional Government and whose jurisdiction is the whole regional territory or the municipality. Their normative reference is the same of every other local police, Municipal or Provincial, but differs for activities or extension of the authority.

For example, Sardinia did not have Corpo Forestale officers at any point as regional law on nature, parks, fire, and forestry is carried out by its own regional Corpo forestale e di vigilanza ambientale, since 1985. Moreover, due to its agricultural and pastoral society, every Sardinian town has both Polizia Municipale, and Corpo Barracellare, a volunteer civilian corps that, when needed by the municipality, deals with animal theft, farm robbery or other farm damages.

Animal Protection 

In some areas, there is an animal protection force, or Guardie Zoofile, that rescue animals in distress and protect animals and wildlife. Agents are volunteer private citizens, who have received some training and have limited powers, with regards to the safety of animals.

The law (number 189) of 20 July 2004, (relating to the acts of animal abuse), assigns the functions and qualifications of the judicial police to the guards of the protectionist and zoophile associations. The agents (recognized by decree issued by the Prefecture) do not have jurisdiction in hunting matters.

Agents will check that people are in compliance with all animal-related municipal, regional and national laws, and may report them to the Carabinieri, Polizia di Stato, Polizia Locale or Forestry Carabinieri as appropriate.

Uniforms and equipment 
The Agents generally wear green uniforms, although different to the Guardia di Finanza and Polizia Locale. As with different local police forces in Italy, they may wear various combinations of:

Beret or mountain or baseball cap (green or black)
Shirt or polo shirt (green or black)
Cargo trousers (green or black)
Bomber jacket (green or black) 
Boots (black)
Duty belt, with radio, handcuffs, gloves, etc.

 Some agents do carry firearms (pistols), but some do not, with differing opinion on the subject.
 There is a more formal uniform (as suit similar to Guardia di Finanza and Polizia uniforms) that some agents wear.
 Motor vehicles used by the Guardie Zoofile generally are marked with such wording and have blue lights and sirens.

Historical 

The Organizzazione di Vigilanza Repressione dell'Antifascismo (or OVRA) (Organization for Vigilance in Repression of Anti-Fascism) was a secret police organization in Italy during fascism.

The Polizia dell'Africa Italiana or PAI (Police of Italian Africa) (1936–1944).

The Guardia Nazionale Repubblicana or GNR (National Republic Guard) was a paramilitary force of the Italian Social Republic created by decree on December 8, 1943, replacing the Carabinieri and the MVSN.

Zaptié were locally raised gendarmerie units in the Italian colonies of Italian Tripolitania, Italian Cyrenaica, Italian Eritrea and Italian Somaliland between 1889 and 1942.

Zaptié were used during the period of Trust Territory of Somaliland from 1950 to 1960. Members were sent to Italy to train, and after 1960, were merged into the Somali Police Force.

Private Security 

As with most of Western Europe, private security organizations play a part in security of money, valuables, property and people.

In Italy, a guard, or security officer, is known as a Guardia di Sicurezza. They may be part of a private security organization, known as a Servizi di Vigilanza Privata and patrol certain areas or guard buildings.

Services include:

Armed and unarmed guarding at banks, shopping centers, courts, museums, construction sites, leisure places, etc.
Armed secure transport/cash-in-transit - of money and valuables

There are certain requirements, similar to police, in order for citizens to become security agents. They must:

be an Italian citizen or a citizen of a member state of the European Union;
have reached the age of majority and have fulfilled military service obligations;
know how to read and write;
not having been convicted of a crime;
be a person of good moral conduct;
be in possession of an identity card;
be registered in the national social insurance fund and in the workplace accidents fund
not have been convicted of criminal activity.

Uniforms and equipment 
Some guards are armed (generally with pistols), similar to police, but some are not. These are generally semi-automatic pistols, or revolvers. The license to carry this must be obtained from the Prefecture by the private security organization, or the hiring organization. This is subject to weapon-handling competency checks and health checks.

Uniforms vary greatly from company to company and are often similar, but distinct, to the state and local police forces. Often marked vehicles are used for security work.

Transportation 

Until recently, all Italian police forces were equipped with Italian-made police cars, with Alfa Romeos most commonly. A patrol car belonging to Polizia is nicknamed Pantera (Panther), one used by the Carabinieri is nicknamed Gazzella (Gazelle).

Every force has helicopters, trucks and campers (used as mobile offices, usually in undercover missions). In Venice, which is built across several islands linked by bridges and surrounded by water, public security and fire brigades work with boats. In 2004, Lamborghini donated two Lamborghini Gallardo police cars to the Polizia di Stato on their 152nd anniversary.

 Arma dei Carabinieri patrol vehicles are dark blue with a red stripe along the side. Majority have white roofs. Their telephone number is also featured - "112" (whilst that of the Polizia di Stato is "113"). Their vehicles have registration plates beginning with "CC". Precedently, Carabinieri cars were dark green: the last green (and the first black) Carabinieri car was the Alfa Romeo Giulia.
 Guardia di Finanza vehicles are dark grey with a thin gold stripe along each side and the words Guardia di Finanza in gold underneath. The vehicle plates begin with the letters "GdiF" in red.
 Polizia di Stato vehicles are light blue with a white stripe along the side and the word POLIZIA in large letters underneath. The license plates start with the word Polizia in red usually followed by a letter and four numbers. Like the Carabinieri vehicles, the cars were green, but before the green colour, the cars were red.
 Polizia Penitenziaria vehicles are dark blue with a light blue stripe along the side and Polizia Penitenziaria in white letters under the stripe. License plates have the entire name POLIZIA PENITENZIARIA on them, followed by three numbers and two letters.
 Corpo Forestale dello Stato vehicles were green with a white stripe and the words CORPO FORESTALE DELLO STATO in white along the side. The vehicle plates began with the letters "CFS" in red. From January 2017 all vehicles have been transferred under the Carabinieri's Comando unità per la tutela forestale, ambientale e agroalimentare. The words "CORPO FORESTALE DELLO STATO" has been replaced with "CARABINIERI", but they still remain green with a white stripe.
 Polizia Provinciale vehicles are white with a green horizontal stripe along the side.
 Polizia Municipale the colours of vehicles depend on regional laws. Usually, the cars are white with blue, green or red stripes and the words "Polizia Municipale" or "Polizia Locale" along the side, in some regions car colour can be black or dark grey. License plates have the entire name POLIZIA LOCALE on them and the letter "Y" followed by another letter, three numbers, and two letters.

See also

 Crime in Italy
Carabinieri
Polizia di Stato
Guardia di Finanza
Polizia Penitenziaria
Polizia Provinciale
Polizia Municipale

References

External links 

 Polizia di Stato (official website) (English; Francais; Espanol; Deutsch)